The Miss Maryland Teen USA competition is the pageant that selects the representative for the state of Maryland in the Miss Teen USA pageant.

Maryland did not place at Miss Teen USA until 1992, but since then this state has been quite successful, including earning four runner-up placements, and a winner in 2010.

Seven Maryland teens have gone on to win the Miss Maryland USA title, and two competed at Miss America.

Soniya Krishan of Wheaton was crowned Miss Maryland Teen USA 2022 on May 15, 2022 at Bethesda North Marriott Hotel and Conference Center in Rockville. She will represent Maryland for the title of Miss Teen USA 2022 in October 2022.

Results summary

Placements
Miss Teen USA: Kamie Crawford (2010)
2nd runners-up: Khosi Roy (1999)
3rd runners-up: Michelle Attai (2002), Amanda Williams (2004), Kasey Staniszewski (2009)
Top 6: Jennifer Smith (1996)
Top 10: Jamie O'Brien (2006)
Top 12: Vanessa Malinas (1992)
Top 15: Alessandra Torres (2005), Kirsten Nicholson (2011), Taylor Spruill (2017), Caleigh Shade (2018), Amalia Sanches (2019)
Top 16: Hannah Brewer (2013), Maria Derisavi (2021)
Maryland holds a record of 15 placements at Miss Teen USA.

Awards
Miss Photogenic: Stacey Harris (1989), Mary Ann Cimino (1990), Allison Farrow (2007)

Winners 

1 Age at the time of the Miss Teen USA pageant

References

External links
Official website

Maryland
Women in Maryland